The Cotton Research and Promotion Act is an act passed by the United States Congress in 1966 in response to the declining market of cotton, in order to build consumer demand and "sell the story of American upland cotton".  Cotton's share of the total retail and home furnishings market was 66 percent in the 1960s, but by 1975, that number had fallen to a record low of 34 percent.

A commercial advertising program began in 2002 especially targeted at women 18 to 34, with the slogan "The feel of cotton".

References

External links
cottoninc.com

United States federal agriculture legislation
Cotton industry in the United States